Tribogna is a comune (municipality) in the Metropolitan City of Genoa in the Italian region Liguria, located about  east of Genoa.

Tribogna borders the following municipalities: Avegno, Cicagna, Mocònesi, Neirone, Rapallo, Uscio.

References

Cities and towns in Liguria